Achiemore is a hamlet in Strath Halladale in Sutherland, in the Highland council area of Scotland. Achiemore is situated to the north of Smigel Burn on the right bank of the Halladale River just beyond where the Allt an Tigh-choinneirnh flows and Upper Bighouse. The village and station of Forsinard is 15 km to the south, and Melvich, on the north coast, is roughly 4.5 miles (7 km) to the north. Culfern is just to the north and contains ruins. The A897 road passes through Achiemore.

Achiemore contains the Strath Halladale Mission Church, a Grade C listed building which is dated to 1845. It is a rectangular rubble church with a long 4-bay elevation facing the A897 to the west. It became a listed building on 7 March 1984.

References

Populated places in Sutherland
Achiemore, Strath Halladale